The team eventing competition was one of six equestrian events on the Equestrian at the 1984 Summer Olympics programme. Dressage and stadium jumping portions of the competition were held at the Santa Anita Racetrack in Arcadia, California, the endurance stage was held at Fairbanks Ranch, California. Scores from the top 3 horse and rider pairs for each nation were summed to give a team score; the lowest pair's score was dropped. Teams without at least 3 finishing pairs were not given a final score.

The competition was split into three phases:

Dressage (29–30 July)
Riders performed the dressage test.
Endurance (1 August)
Riders tackled roads and tracks, steeplechase and cross-country portions.
Jumping (3 August)
Riders jumped at the show jumping course.

Results

References

External links
1984 Summer Olympics official report Volume 2, Part 2. pp. 384–85. 

Team eventing